Sauret may refer to:

In people
 Audrey Sauret (born 1976), French basketball player
 Émile Sauret (1852-1920), French violinist and composer
 Henriette Sauret (1890-1976), French feminist, author, pacifist, journalist
 Nunik Sauret (born 1951), Mexican printmaker
 Pierre François Sauret (1742-1818), French Army officer

In places
 Sauret-Besserve, commune in the Puy-de-Dôme department in Auvergne-Rhône-Alpes in central France